Pro-Football-Reference.com is a website providing a variety of statistics for American football.  It is one of the few sites that provides information on both active and retired players. The site provides statistics for teams dating back to 1920.  It has statistics for quarterbacks, running backs, receivers, kickers, returners, and punters, as well as some defensive statistics, and Pro Bowl rosters.  It also has each team's game-by-game results.

The website is maintained by Sports Reference, and Fantasy Sports Ventures maintains a minority stake in the organization. The website has been used as a reliable source of information by publishers such as Bloomberg Businessweek, Forbes, The New York Times, and ESPN.

The company also publishes similar statistics websites for basketball, baseball, and hockey.

References

External links
 

National Football League websites
Internet properties established in 2003